Cleared for Take Off is a 2003 compilation album by Jefferson Airplane.

Cleared for Take Off may also refer to:
Cleared for Take-Off, a 1996 book by Sir Dirk Bogarde
Cleared for Take Off, a 1997 book by Stephen Barlay